Maharaja Agrasen College may refer to:
Maharaja Agrasen College, a college situated in East Delhi.
Maharaja Agrasen College, Jagadhri, a college situated in Jagadhri, Haryana.